Daily Guide may refer to:

 The Daily Guide, a daily newspaper published in Pulaski County, Missouri, United States
 Daily Guide (Ghana), a daily newspaper published in Accra, Ghana